Millers Pond is a small park in the Spring Park area of the London Borough of Croydon, England.

Description
It is surrounded by residential housing and is bounded to the south by Shirley Way (where the main entrance is located) and to the west by The Lees, with additional access onto Worcester Close to the east and Farm Lane (off Bennetts Way) to the north.

The pond features a number of timber structures around its perimeter, including a viewing platform, a dipping platform, and a boardwalk. The larger of the pond's two islands has a duck platform. The park includes toilet facilities.

Millers Pond is a Green Flag Award winner.

History
 
Millers Pond was originally part of Spring Park Farm until its acquisition by Croydon Council in 1934. The pond itself is the largest of three that originally existed on the site. Farm Lane now runs where the farm buildings stood; the two smaller ponds were subsequently developed. Millers Pond derives its name from the last family to work on Spring Park Farm. The ponds of Spring Park Farm were once fed by a stream that ran around three sides of Temple Avenue Copse, a  area of mixed woodland to the southwest.

The rapid development of the area surrounding Spring Park in the first half of the 20th century can be seen in successive Ordnance Survey maps:

 Six inches to the mile, England and Wales: Kent XV (includes: Croydon St John the Baptist) – surveyed 1868; published 1871
 Six inches to the mile, England and Wales: Surrey XIV.SE (includes: Beckenham; Croydon St John the Baptist) – revised 1894–1895; published 1898
 25 inches to the mile, England and Wales: Surrey XIV.12 (Beckenham; Croydon St John the Baptist) – revised 1911; published 1912
 25 inches to the mile, England and Wales: Surrey XIV.12 (Beckenham; Croydon St John the Baptist) – revised 1934; published 1935
 25 inches to the mile, England and Wales: Surrey XIV.12 (Beckenham; Croydon St John the Baptist) – revised 1942; published 1947

When Spring Park House was put up for auction in July 1957, its  of grounds were described as follows:

The lawns slope gradually away from the House to the south, with rhododendron and azalea bushes, to the Ornamental Lakes, Tennis Lawn and small Meadow. The boundaries are all well screened by matured trees and amongst several fine specimens are various cypress, chestnut and elm, a mulberry, a quince and one of the largest girth oak trees in the country.

Millers Pond is managed by Croydon Council in partnership with Friends of Millers Pond, a volunteer group of local residents formed in 1998 to represent the users of the park and monitor proposed changes.

Wildlife
Species of wildfowl commonly seen in the pond include mallards, Canada geese, coots, and moorhens. Occasional visitors include greylag geese, Egyptian geese, bean geese, Muscovy ducks, tufted ducks, mute swans, herons, cormorants, and even mandarin ducks. Feral parakeets and various gulls also commonly visit the park. No fishing is allowed in the park and dogs must be kept on leads.

Millers Pond and its two adjacent ponds to the north (which are not publicly accessible) are notably home to a diverse range of amphibians, including frogs, toads, and both smooth and palmate newts (the latter a rare species in London).

According to GiGL, the ponds "are of value simply due to the shortage of wetland habitats on the dry foothills of the North Downs".

Gallery

References

Further reading
 Wheeler, R. (May 2016). Spring Park Farm Estate – a family affair. Spring Park Activities News no. 804: 45–47.
 Wheeler, R. (August 2017). Spring Park House. Spring Park Activities News no. 819: 16–19.
 Anon. (March 2016). The Gower-built homes of Spring Park. Spring Park Activities News no. 802: 23–25.
 Anon. (April 2021). Bygone Spring Park. Spring Park Activities News no. 860: 19.

External links

 Millers Pond at GoParksLondon
 Millers Pond at Grow Wild
 Photo of Millers Pond  1965

Parks and open spaces in the London Borough of Croydon
Urban public parks in the United Kingdom
1934 establishments in England